Salim is the pen name for Abdul-Rehman Begi Saheb-Qiran (Ebdulrehman Begî Sahibqîran, Kurdish: عەبدولڕەحمان بەگی ساحێبقران) the nineteenth century Kurdish poet. Known by his pseudonym as Salim or Salem (Kurdish: سالم), he was born around 1800 in Sulaymaniyah, Kurdistan and died 1866. He is one of the most significant classical Kurdish poets who wrote in Central Kurdish. He was the uncle of Nalî and the cousin of Kurdî, two other famous poets. He died in 1866 in Sulaymaniyah.

Salim's poems
The content of Salim's poems mainly consists of love, philosophy, mysticism and history. Most of his poems are in the form of Ghazal, but he has some quatrains (Ruba'is) and Qasidas. His poems are in Kurdish, Persian and Arabic. He was influenced by the Persian poets Hafez and Kalim Hamedani and the Kurdish poet Nali. His poetry is metrical mostly based on arud meter.

References

External links
 Charmw.net
 Amroy Zanko

People from Sulaymaniyah
Iraqi Kurdish poets
1800 births
1866 deaths
19th-century poets of Ottoman Iraq
Persian-language poets
Arabic-language poets
19th-century Kurdish people